Father Brown is a British television detective period drama which has aired on BBC One since 14 January 2013. It features Mark Williams as the eponymous crime-solving Roman Catholic priest. The series is loosely based on short stories by G. K. Chesterton.

Series overview

Episodes

Series 1 (2013)

Series 2 (2014)

Series 3 (2015)

Series 4 (2016)

Series 5 (2016–17)

Series 6 (2017–18)

Series 7 (2019)

Series 8 (2020)

Series 9 (2022)

Series 10 (2023)
All episodes for this series became available on the BBC iPlayer from the 6 January 2023

References

External links 
 Father Brown BBC programme homepage
 

Lists of British crime drama television series episodes